Polyclinic Hospital may refer to:
Polyclinic Medical Center in Harrisburg, Pennsylvania
Stuyvesant Polyclinic Hospital in New York City